Zhang Li (born 17 January 1989 in Jiangxi) is a female Chinese javelin thrower. Her personal best throw is 65.47 metres, achieved in September 2014 in Incheon.

Biography
She won the 2005 World Youth Championships, finished fifth at the 2005 Asian Championships, fourth at the 2006 World Junior Championships, fourth at the 2008 World Junior Championships and tenth at the 2008 Olympic Games. She won the silver medal in the women's javelin throw event at the 2009 East Asian Games held in Hong Kong.

Achievements

References

Team China 2008

External links

1989 births
Living people
Chinese female javelin throwers
Athletes from Jiangxi
Olympic athletes of China
Athletes (track and field) at the 2008 Summer Olympics
Athletes (track and field) at the 2012 Summer Olympics
Asian Games gold medalists for China
Asian Games medalists in athletics (track and field)
Athletes (track and field) at the 2014 Asian Games
World Athletics Championships athletes for China
Medalists at the 2014 Asian Games
21st-century Chinese women